is a passenger railway station in the city of Tomioka, Gunma, Japan, operated by the private railway operator Jōshin Dentetsu.

Lines

Station layout
The station has a single side platform and a single island platform, connected to the station building by a level crossing.

Platforms

Adjacent stations

History
It was renamed to its present name in 1921. The current station building was completed in 2014

Surrounding area

Tomioka Post Office
Tomioka City Hal

See also
 List of railway stations in Japan

External links

 Jōshin Dentetsu 
 Burari-Gunma 

Railway stations in Gunma Prefecture
Railway stations in Japan opened in 1897
Tomioka, Gunma